South Yanggao Road is a station on Line 7 of the Shanghai Metro, located in Pudong District. It opened in 2009.

The station has 4 platforms, but only the 2 outer platforms are in regular service.

References

Railway stations in Shanghai
Line 7, Shanghai Metro
Shanghai Metro stations in Pudong
Railway stations in China opened in 2009